The Three Faces of Eve is a 1957 American film noir mystery drama film presented in CinemaScope, based on the book of the same name about the life of Chris Costner Sizemore, which was written by psychiatrists Corbett H. Thigpen and Hervey M. Cleckley, who also helped write the screenplay. Sizemore, also known as Eve White, was a woman they suggested might have dissociative identity disorder (then known as multiple personality disorder). Sizemore's identity was concealed in interviews about this film and was not revealed to the public until 1977. The film was directed by Nunnally Johnson.

Joanne Woodward won the Academy Award for Best Actress, making her the first actress to win an Oscar for portraying three personalities (Eve White, Eve Black, and Jane). The Three Faces of Eve also became the first film since 1936—when Bette Davis won for Dangerous (1935)—to win the Best Actress award without getting nominated in another category.

Plot
In 1951, Eve White is a timid, self-effacing wife and mother who has severe and blinding headaches and occasional blackouts. Eve eventually goes to see psychiatrist Dr. Luther, and while having a conversation, a "new personality", the wild, fun-loving Eve Black, emerges. Eve Black knows everything about Eve White, but Eve White is unaware of Eve Black.

Eve White is sent to a hospital for observation after Eve Black is found strangling Eve White's daughter, Bonnie. When Eve White is released, her husband Ralph finds a job in another state and leaves her in a boarding house, while Bonnie stays with Eve's parents. When Ralph returns, he tells her that he doesn't believe she has multiple personalities and tries to take her to Jacksonville, Florida, with him but she feels she isn't well enough to leave, and, afraid Eve Black will try to harm Bonnie again, refuses to go. Eve Black confronts Ralph at his motel, where he realizes Eve Black is real, but allows her to convince him to take her to Jacksonville. When Eve Black goes out dancing with another man, Ralph slaps her when she returns and ends up divorcing Eve White.

Dr. Luther considers both Eve White and Eve Black to be incomplete and inadequate personalities. The film depicts Dr. Luther's attempts to understand and deal with these two faces of Eve. Under hypnosis at one session, a third personality emerges, the relatively stable Jane. Dr. Luther eventually prompts her to remember a traumatic event in Eve's childhood. Her grandmother had died when she was six, and according to family custom, relatives were supposed to kiss the dead person at the viewing, making it easier for them to let go. While Eve screams, her mother forces her to kiss the corpse. Apparently, Eve's terror led to the creation of different personalities.

After discovering the trauma, Jane remembers her entire past. When Dr. Luther asks to speak with Eve White and Eve Black, Jane says they are gone. Jane marries a man named Earl whom she met when she was Jane and reunites with her daughter Bonnie.

Cast
 Joanne Woodward as Eve White / Eve Black / Jane
 Mimi Gibson as Eve - Age 8
 David Wayne as Ralph White
 Lee J. Cobb as Doctor Curtis Luther
 Edwin Jerome as Doctor Francis Day
 Alena Murray as Secretary
 Nancy Kulp as Mrs. Black
 Douglas Spencer as Mr. Black
 Terry Ann Ross as Bonnie White
 Ken Scott as Earl
 Alistair Cooke as the narrator of the film

Original book
The book by Thigpen and Cleckley was rushed into publication, and the film rights were immediately sold to director Nunnally Johnson in 1957, apparently to capitalize on public interest in multiple personalities following the publication of Shirley Jackson's 1954 novel The Bird's Nest, which was also made into a film in 1957 titled Lizzie.

The real Eve
Chris Costner Sizemore has written at some length about her experiences as the real "Eve". In her 1958 book The Final Face of Eve, she used the pseudonym Evelyn Lancaster. In her 1977 book I'm Eve, she revealed her true identity. She also wrote a follow-up book, A Mind of My Own (1989).

Reception
Critics uniformly praised Joanne Woodward's performance, but opinions of other aspects of the film were more mixed. Bosley Crowther of The New York Times wrote that Woodward played her part "with superlative flexibility and emotional power", but that "when you come right down to it, this is simply a melodramatic exercise—an exhibition of psychiatric hocus-pocus, without any indication of how or why. It makes for a fairly fetching mystery, although it is too verbose and too long." Variety wrote that the film was "frequently an intriguing and provocative motion picture" and that Woodward "fulfills her assignment excellently", but believed that the comedy elements "will undoubtedly confuse many viewers who won't quite be sure what emotions are suitable". Harrison's Reports called the film "a fascinating adult drama" and said that Woodward's performance was "of Academy Award caliber". John McCarten of The New Yorker wrote that Woodward "does well in a role that is inevitably full of confusion", but the film "seems rather fantastic when it depicts the heroine going through her mental gyrations at top speed". The Monthly Film Bulletin agreed, writing that Woodward "manages the triple role cleverly", but found that the depiction of psychiatric treatment "all looks a good deal too easy, and in spite of Alistair Cooke's introductory assurances of authenticity one is always conscious of being given the case history in capsule form".

The film holds a score of 94% on the review-aggregation website Rotten Tomatoes based on 16 reviews.

Accolades

Joanne Woodward won the Academy Award for Best Actress, and later went on to play Dr. Cornelia Wilbur in the film Sybil (1976).
It was a reversal of roles for Woodward, who played the psychiatrist who diagnosed Sybil Dorsett (played by Sally Field, who subsequently won an Primetime Emmy Award for her portrayal) with multiple personality disorder and subsequently led her through treatment.

See also

 List of mental disorders in film
Chris Costner Sizemore, the real-life woman on whom Eve is based.

References

Sources

External links
 
 
 
 

1957 films
1957 drama films
20th Century Fox films
American black-and-white films
American drama films
Films about psychiatry
Films based on non-fiction books
Films directed by Nunnally Johnson
Films scored by Robert Emmett Dolan
Films featuring a Best Actress Academy Award-winning performance
Films featuring a Best Drama Actress Golden Globe-winning performance
Films about hypnosis
Films set in Georgia (U.S. state)
Films with screenplays by Nunnally Johnson
Films about dissociative identity disorder
CinemaScope films
1950s English-language films
1950s American films